The John Welling House is a historic Dutch Colonial home in Pennington, New Jersey that dates to the early 18th century.  John Welling moved to the Hopewell valley from Jamaica, New York in 1727 and leased the home and  farm from Terit Lester, purchasing it the next year.  A tradition exists that during the British occupation of Pennington during the American Revolution a Hessian soldier was taken captive in the home.  Welling's great-granddaughter, Elizabeth Welling, married John D. Hart who built the adjacent John D. Hart House, which is also on the National Register of Historic Places.  The home remained in the Welling family until 1921 and from 1928 until 1973 was home to Congressman Charles R. Howell.  The house is a rare example of a Dutch clapboard and shingle house, one of the few remaining in Mercer County.

See also
National Register of Historic Places listings in Mercer County, New Jersey

References

National Register of Historic Places in Mercer County, New Jersey
Houses in Mercer County, New Jersey
Pennington, New Jersey
New Jersey Register of Historic Places